The Sekukhune flat lizard (Platysaurus orientalis) is a species of lizard in the family Cordylidae. The species is endemic to South Africa. It has two subspecies.

Description
Females and juveniles have a black back with white stripes, as well as a white belly. Adult male Sekukhune flat lizards have a green body, and a tail which is orange or red above, and yellow underneath.

Geographic range and habitat
The Sekukhune flat lizard lives in a small area of savannah in South Africa in the Sekhukhuneland natural region. This includes the Mpumalanga Escarpment.

Reproduction
Female Sekukhune flat lizards lay two eggs in a rock crack in early summer.

Diet
The diet of the Sekukhune flat lizard includes insects, including caterpillars.

Subspecies
Two subspecies are recognized.

P. o. orientalis  – Drakensberg mountains in Mpumalanga in South Africa.
P. o. fitzsimonsi  – eastern Sekhukhuneland.

The subspecific name, fitzsimonsi, is in honor of South African herpetologist (Mr.) Vivian Frederick Maynard FitzSimons.

See also
Platysaurus
Cordylidae

References

Further reading
FitzSimons V. 1941. Descriptions of some New Lizards from South Africa and a Frog from Southern Rhodesia. Ann. Transvaal Mus. 20 (3): 273-281. (Platysaurus minor orientalis, new subspecies, p. 280).
Jacobsen NHG, Newbery RE. 1989. The Genus Platysaurus A. Smith 1844 in the Transvaal. African J. Herp. 36: 51-63. (Platysaurus orientalis, new combination; Platysaurus orientalis fitzsimonsi, new combination).
Loveridge A. 1944. Revision of the African Lizards of the Family Cordylidae. Bull. Mus. Comp. Zool. 95 (1): 1-118 + Plates 1-12. (Platysaurus guttatus fitzsimonsi, new subspecies, pp. 88–89).

External links
More Information

Platysaurus
Reptiles of South Africa
Taxa named by Vivian Frederick Maynard FitzSimons
Reptiles described in 1941